The Kuttippuram Block Panchayat is the block-level administrative body that administers the region around Kuttippuram in Malappuram district, Kerala, India. It is also one of the 15 Block Panchayats established for the proper block-level administration of Gram panchayats in the district. Established in 1962, the block's current president is Vaseema Veleri since 2020. Kuttippuram Block Panchayat lies in two assembly constituencies – Kottakkal (State Assembly constituency) and Tirur (State Assembly constituency) – both of which are part of the Ponnani parliamentary constituency. The Block is headed by a President and council, and manages 155.83 km2 of Kuttippuram block, with a population of about 229,468 within that area.

History
As per the recommendations of Balwant Rai Mehta Committee and the Administrative Reforms Committee chaired by E. M. S. Namboodiripad, the State Government had to enact legislation to empower the Panchayats to ensure greater public participation in social development, to shape planned development at the village level, and to implement decentralization. The Kerala Panchayat Act, 1960 was framed and came into force on 1 January 1962 in the state. Under this Act, 922 Gram Panchayats were formed covering all the rural areas of the State. In these panchayats elected governing bodies came into power with effect from 1 January 1964.

Kuttippuram was the headquarters of a Revenue block (Firka) in Tirur Taluk. The erstwhile Firkas were reshaped into Block Panchayats and were provided with the duty for block-level administration of Gram panchayats. Hence Kuttippuram Block Panchayat came into existence on 1 January 1962. At the time of its formation, the block was composed of seven Gram panchayats namely Kuttippuram, Valanchery, Parudur, Irimbiliyam, Edayur, Marakkara, and Athavanad. Later on 16 June 1969, Parudur village was transferred to Palakkad district, and in 2015, Valanchery was upgraded to a Municipal town. Other jurisdictional change that occurred in 2015 was the addition of Kalpakanchery Gram Panchayat into block.

Structure
Kuttippuram Block Panchayat consists of the following Gram panchayats:

Valanchery Municipality is landlocked by Kuttippuram block to all sides.
{ "type": "ExternalData",  "service": "geoshape",  "ids": "Q13110215,Q16135161,Q13110441,Q6354338,Q13111373,Q16136276"}

Members of the Block Council
Key

Election results

Kuttippuram Block Panchayat Election 2020

Kuttippuram Block Panchayat Election 2015

Kuttippuram Block Panchayat Election 2010

See also
 List of Gram Panchayats in Malappuram district
 List of villages in Malappuram district
 List of desoms in Malappuram district (1981)
 Kuttippuram (State Assembly constituency)
 Tirur Taluk
 Kuttippuram
 Valanchery
 Puthanathani
 Athavanad
 Kalpakanchery
 Valiyakunnu
 Vettichira
 Edayoor
 Irimbiliyam

References

External links 
 

Malappuram district
1962 establishments in Kerala